is a Japanese professional shogi player, ranked 8-dan. Inaba, together with Tetsurō Itodani, Masayuki Toyoshima and Akihiro Murata, is one of four Kansai-based young shogi professionals who are collectively referred to as the "Young Kansai Big Four" (関西若手四天王 Kansai Wakate Shitennō).

Promotion history
Inaba's promotion history is as follows:
 6-kyū: September 2000
 4-dan: April 1, 2008
 5-dan: March 8, 2011
 6-dan: May 1, 2012
 7-dan: August 16, 2013
 8-dan: February 18, 2016

Titles and other championships
Inaba has appeared in a major title match only once: he was the challenger for the Meijin title in 2017. He earned the right to challenge Amahiko Satō for the title by winning the 2016-2017 Class A ranking tournament with a record of 8 wins and 1 loss, thus becoming the eighth player in history to win the right to challenge for the Meijin title in his first year in Class A.

Inaba has won two non-major title championships: the 21st  tournament in 2013, and the 70th NHK Cup tournament in 2021.

Year-end prize money and game fee ranking
Inaba has finished in the "Top 10" of the JSA's  three times: 6th with JPY 28,010,000 in earnings in 2017; 9th with JPY 17,030,000 in earnings in 2021; and 10th with JPY 15,800,000 in earnings in 2022.

References

External links
 ShogiHub: Professional Player Info · Inaba, Akira
 Shogi Fan: Inaba will be the next Meijin challenger

1988 births
Japanese shogi players
Living people
Professional shogi players
Professional shogi players from Hyōgo Prefecture
People from Nishinomiya
Ginga